Hydriomena pluviata, the sharp green hydriomena moth, is a species of geometrid moth in the family Geometridae. It is found in North America.

The MONA or Hodges number for Hydriomena pluviata is 7239.

Subspecies
These two subspecies belong to the species Hydriomena pluviata:
 Hydriomena pluviata meridianata McDunnough, 1954
 Hydriomena pluviata pluviata

References

Further reading

 
 

Hydriomena
Articles created by Qbugbot
Moths described in 1858